The Gallup Commercial Historic District is a historic district which was listed on the National Register of Historic Places in 2016.

It includes "the largest concentration of historic commercial buildings in Gallup", in one- and two-story stores along U.S. Route 66 and W. Coal Ave.in Gallup.  It includes 65 contributing buildings, one contributing structure, and a contributing object, as well as 26 non-contributing buildings.

The district also includes seven properties already separately listed on the National Register:
Rex Hotel
Old U.S. Post Office
Palace Lodge
El Morro Theater
Grand Hotel (Ricca's Mercantile)
White Café, and 
Chief Theater.

The listing newly adds 58 contributing buildings and adds  to the National Register (excluding the area of the seven previously listed properties).

References

External links

National Register of Historic Places in McKinley County, New Mexico
Historic districts on the National Register of Historic Places in New Mexico